Milnesium is a genus of tardigrades. It is rather common, being found in a wide variety of habitats across the world. It has a fossil record extending back to the Cretaceous, the oldest species found so far (M. swolenskyi) is known from Turonian stage deposits on the east coast of the United States.Milnesiums are one of the most desiccation and radiation-resistant invertebrates on Earth because of their unique ability to transform into a "tun" state and utilize intrinsically disordered proteins when experiencing extreme environments.

Species
Described species include:

 Milnesium alabamae Wallendorf & Miller, 2009
Milnesium almatyense Tumanov, 2006
 Milnesium alpigenum Ehrenberg, 1853
Milnesium antarcticum Tumanov, 2006
 Milnesium argentinum Roszkowska, Ostrowska & Kaczmarek, 2015
Milnesium asiaticum Tumanov, 2006
 Milnesium barbadosense Meyer & Hinton, 2012
 Milnesium beasleyi Kaczmarek, Jakubowska & Michalczyk, 2012
 Milnesium beatae Roszkowska, Ostrowska & Kaczmarek, 2015
 Milnesium berladnicorum Ciobanu, Zawierucha, Moglan & Kaczmarek, 2014
 Milnesium bohleberi Bartels, Nelson, Kaczmarek & Michalczyk, 2014
Milnesium brachyungue Binda & Pilato, 1990
 Milnesium cassandrae Moreno-Talamantes, Roszkowska,  García-Aranda, Flores-Maldonado & Kaczmarek, 2019
Milnesium burgessi Schlabach, Donaldson, Hobelman, Miller & Lowman, 2018
 Milnesium dornensis Ciobanu, Roszkowska & Kaczmarek, 2015
Milnesium dujiangensis Yang, 2003
Milnesium eurystomum Maucci, 1991
 Milnesium fridae Moreno-Talamantes, León-Espinosa, García-Aranda, Flores-Maldonado & Kaczmarek, 2020
 Milnesium granulatum Ramazzotti, 1962
 Milnesium jacobi Meyer & Hinton, 2010
Milnesium katarzynae Kaczmarek, Michalczyk & Beasley, 2004
 Milnesium kogui Londoño, Daza, Caicedo, Quiroga & Kaczmarek, 2015
 Milnesium krzysztofi Kaczmarek & Michalczyk, 2007
 Milnesium lagniappe Meyer, Hinton & Dupré, 2013
Milnesium longiungue Tumanov, 2006
 Milnesium minutum Pilato & Lisi, 2016
 Milnesium quadrifidum Nederström, 1919
 Milnesium rastrum Suzuki, Sugiura, Tsujimoto, and McInnes, 2023
 Milnesium reductum Tumanov, 2006
 Milnesium reticulatum Pilato, Binda & Lisi, 2002
 Milnesium sandrae Pilato & Lisi, 2016
 Milnesium shilohae Meyer, 2015
Milnesium swansoni Young, Chappell, Miller & Lowman, 2016
† Milnesium swolenskyi Bertolani & Grimaldi, 2000
Milnesium tardigradum Doyère, 1840
Milnesium tetralamellatum Pilato & Binda, 1991
 Milnesium tumanovi Pilato, Sabella & Lisi, 2016
 Milnesium validum Pilato, Sabella, D'Urso & Lisi, 2017
 Milnesium variefidum Morek, Gąsiorek, Stec, Blagden & Michalczyk, 2016
 Milnesium vorax Pilato, Sabella & Lisi, 2016
 Milnesium zsalakoae Meyer & Hinton, 2010

References

Apochela
Tardigrade genera